Corey Parker (born July 8, 1965) is an American actor and acting coach.

Early life
Corey Parker is the son of actress Rochelle Natalie "Rocky" Parker (1940–2014) and her second husband, John David Haas. Parker began his acting career at the age of four, starting in television commercials. He later attended the High School of Performing Arts.

Career 
Following high school, Parker committed to acting full-time. He is a member of the Actors Studio and the Ensemble Studio Theater. Parker performed onstage at the 61st Academy Awards.

Movies in which Parker has appeared include Biloxi Blues, Willy/Milly, White Palace, Friday the 13th: A New Beginning, and How I Got Into College. He has also appeared on television in series including Thirtysomething, Broadway Bound, Blue Skies, Love Boat: The Next Wave, and co-starred with Téa Leoni in the 1992-93 Fox sitcom Flying Blind. He later had a recurring role on the sitcom Will & Grace. His television movies include The Lost Language of Cranes for the BBC, Mr. and Mrs. Loving, Courage with Sophia Loren, A Mother's Prayer, and Destiny, The Elizabeth Taylor Story.

An acting coach, Parker has been guest artist at Rhodes College and at the University of Memphis. He was the official acting coach for CMT's Sun Records and will also work as a coach on Ms. Marvel. Parker is a guest instructor at HB Studio.

Filmography

Film

Television

References

External links
 
 

1965 births
Living people
American acting coaches
American male film actors
American male television actors
Male actors from New York City
Fiorello H. LaGuardia High School alumni